The Sonnighorn (it Pizzo Bottarello) is a mountain of the Pennine Alps, located on the Swiss-Italian border. The closest locality is Saas Almagell on the west side.

References

External links
 Sonnighorn on Hikr

Mountains of the Alps
Alpine three-thousanders
Mountains of Switzerland
Mountains of Italy
Italy–Switzerland border
International mountains of Europe
Mountains of Valais